Panthavoor is a small village in Ponnani taluk of Malappuram district in the Indian state of Kerala. This village stands in Alamkode Panchayath.

Transportation
Panthavoor village connects to other parts of India through Kuttippuram town.  National highway No.66 passes through Edappal and the northern stretch connects to Goa and Mumbai.  The southern stretch connects to Cochin and Trivandrum.   National Highway No.966 connects to Palakkad and Coimbatore.  The nearest airport is at Kozhikode.  The nearest major railway station is at Kuttippuram.

References

Villages in Malappuram district
Kuttippuram area
[{Panthavoor Perumukku}]
[{Ponnani Thalook, Alamkode Village Perumpadappu Block Alamkode Panchayath ]}
2. Grid tie solar changaramkulam

Panthavoor Palam 
Milma Booth Panthavoor Palam
Sree Karekkad Bhagavathi Temple Panthavoor Perumukku
Perumukku Juma Masjid 
AM Motor Panthavoor
Hollow Brick Company Perumukku
Akshaya Center Panthavoor Palam